Wizard is a game system of medieval fantasy magical combat published by Metagaming in 1978 that was designed to compliment the previously published  Melee, a system of melee combat rules. Forty years later, Wizard was revived and re-released by Steve Jackson Games.

Gameplay 
The previously published Melee had outlined the rules of melee combat using two physical ability scores, Strength (ST) and Dexterity (DT), to determine success. Wizard is an expansion of the Melee tactical system that adds magical combat. Like Melee, it also uses Strength and Dexterity scores, but adds IQ as a third ability score to determine the number and type of spells that can be learned.

At the time Wizard was published, most games that required character generation used random dice rolls to generate ability scores. Wizard and Melee were some of the first games, if not the first, to use a point-buy system: each player was given a fixed number of points with which to buy their character's three abilities. 
Strength governs how much fatigue the figure could endure while casting spells, with each spell having a fatigue cost associated with it. Casting a spell causes a temporary drain on one's strength score, limiting the number of spells one can cast in a given period of time before resting. 
Dexterity is used to determine if a spell is successfully cast: the player casting the spell rolls three dice; if the sum is less than the spellcaster's Dexterity score, the spell works.  
IQ determines the number and complexity of spells a figure can learn, with one spell per point of IQ. A high IQ score – up to 16 – allows the use of more varied and powerful spells. IQ also determines whether or not an Image or Illusion spell cast by an opponent can be disbelieved.

The concept of armor is also introduced in Wizard. Wearing armor reduces the number of hit points from opponents' successful attacks, but penalizes the character's Dexterity score.

Game components of Wizard include a hex sheet for use as a map, a set of rules, and laminated counters to be used for characters and opponents.

Development and publication history
In 1977, Metagaming Concepts pioneered the concept of the microgame, a small, simple wargame packaged in a ziplock bag. The first in Metagaming's MicroGame line was Ogre, a mini-wargame designed by Metagaming employee Steve Jackson. The third game in the MicroGame series was Jackson's Melee, and #6 was Wizard, published by Metagaming in 1978.

Both Melee and Wizard were expanded and re-released as Advanced Wizard and Advanced Melee, with many role-playing elements added to the basic fantasy combat system. 

Melee, Wizard and gamemaster supplement In the Labyrinth eventually formed Metagaming's The Fantasy Trip (TFT) fantasy role-playing system in 1980. Jackson had wanted TFT published as one boxed set, but when Howard Thompson, owner of Metagaming, decided to release it as four separate books instead of a boxed set, and changed his production methods so that Jackson would not be able to check the final proofs of the game, Jackson left Metagaming and founded Steve Jackson Games later that year.

When Steve Jackson released Generic Universaal Roleplaying System (GURPS) in 1986, some of the concepts used in Wizard were used in the GURPS fantasy supplements.

In late 2017, Jackson used a provision of U.S. copyright law to reclaim the rights to The Fantasy Trip, allowing Steve Jackson Games to re-release Wizard in 2019.

Reception
In the January 1980 edition of Dragon (Issue 33), Brad McMillan liked the quality of the game components, as well as the advantages that the new point-buy system for abilities had over random determination by dice. McMillan recommended Wizard  and its companion piece, Melee, saying, "Wizard is an excellent game and well worth the purchase price of $3.95. With the addition of Melee, weapon combat can be added for a wider range of tactical possibilities. Wizard and Melee were designed to mesh, and they do so well. This game offers an innovative alternative to chance-determined characters."

Steve Perrin reviewed Advanced Wizard for Different Worlds magazine and stated that "Like its partners, this is a well-done set of rules and well deserves purchase."

In the 1980 book The Complete Book of Wargames, game designer Jon Freeman commented, "Wizard is really the completion of Melee. Though it is playable in its own right, the whole is greater than the sum of the parts." Freeman concluded by giving the game an Overall Evaluation of "Very Good", saying, "With the microgame reputation for simplicity and economy, it may be too good a bargain to be taken as seriously as it deserves."

In Issue 27 of Simulacrum, Brian Train noted, "Together with Melee, this set of simple rules for magical combat formed the framework for an array of expansions (Advanced Melee and Advanced Wizard) and associated
games that are best with both base games."

Other reviews and commentary
Pegasus #10 (Oct. 1982)
Magia i Miecz (Issue 5 – 1993) (Polish)
Fantastic Science Fiction v27 n11

References

External links 
 The Museum of Role-Playing Games
 

Board games introduced in 1978
Fantasy board games
Steve Jackson (American game designer) games
Metagaming Concepts games